6980 Kyusakamoto, provisional designation , is a stony Koronis asteroid from the outer region of the asteroid belt, approximately 9 kilometers in diameter. It was discovered by Japanese astronomers Kin Endate and Kazuro Watanabe at Kitami Observatory on 16 September 1993.  The asteroid was named after Japanese singer Kyu Sakamoto.

Orbit and classification 

Kyusakamoto is a member of the Koronis family, which is named after 158 Koronis and consists of about 300 known bodies with nearly ecliptical orbits. It orbits the Sun in the outer main-belt at a distance of 2.7–3.0 AU once every 4 years and 9 months (1,743 days). Its orbit has an eccentricity of 0.05 and an inclination of 3° with respect to the ecliptic.

Physical characteristics

Rotation period 

In August 2012, a rotational lightcurve of Kyusakamoto was obtained through photometric observations at the Palomar Transient Factory, California. The lightcurve showed a period of  hours with a brightness amplitude of 0.40 in magnitude. In the Mould-R filter (R), a different photometric band, the observations rendered a nearly identical period of  hours with an amplitude of 0.41.

Diameter and albedo 

According to the survey carried out by the NEOWISE mission of NASA's space-based Wide-field Infrared Survey Explorer, Kyusakamoto measures 8.8 kilometers in diameter and its surface has a high albedo of 0.30, while the Collaborative Asteroid Lightcurve Link assumes a stony albedo of 0.24 and calculates a slightly larger diameter of 9.0 kilometers.

Naming 

This minor planet was named in memory of Japanese popular singer Kyu Sakamoto (1941–1985), who died in the crash of Japan Airlines Flight 123, the deadliest single-aircraft accident in history. Adored as "Kyu-chan", he is best known for his hit, I Look Up As I Walk ("Sukiyaki"), which became a worldwide bestseller. The naming also refers to his collaborators Rokusuke Ei and Hachidai Nakamura, songwriter and pianist, respectively. The official naming citation was published by the Minor Planet Center on 5 October 1998.

References

External links 
 Asteroid Lightcurve Database (LCDB), query form (info )
 Dictionary of Minor Planet Names, Google books
 Asteroids and comets rotation curves, CdR – Observatoire de Genève, Raoul Behrend
 Discovery Circumstances: Numbered Minor Planets (5001)-(10000) – Minor Planet Center
 
 

006980
Discoveries by Kin Endate
Discoveries by Kazuro Watanabe
Named minor planets
19930916